Steane Kremerskothen is a former Australian rules football player from Tasmania, Australia. Kremerskothen holds the record for number of games played at the top level of regional and statewide football in Tasmania.  He played 49 games for Launceston Football Club, 61 with Clarence Football Club, and 242 with North Launceston Football Club for a total of 352 senior appearances. Kremerskothen was the captain of the North Launceston team that won the 1995 TFL Statewide League Grand Final.

References

Living people
Australian rules footballers from Tasmania
Launceston Football Club players
North Launceston Football Club players
Clarence Football Club players
Tasmanian Football Hall of Fame inductees
Year of birth missing (living people)